Ivan Dimitrov (born 9 December 1973) is a Bulgarian sports shooter. He competed in the men's 25 metre rapid fire pistol event at the 1992 Summer Olympics.

References

External links
 

1973 births
Living people
Bulgarian male sport shooters
Olympic shooters of Bulgaria
Shooters at the 1992 Summer Olympics
Place of birth missing (living people)